Robert Nelson David Hicks (4 June 1933 – 25 November 2014) was a Progressive Conservative party member of the House of Commons of Canada. He became a teacher and school principal by career.

Hicks studied at McMaster University and the University of Ottawa. He was an educator and served as principal of Joseph Howe Senior Public School in Toronto.

He represented the Ontario riding of Scarborough East which he won in the 1984 federal election and was re-elected in 1988.

He served in the 32nd and 33rd Canadian Parliaments, then left national politics in 1993 and did not campaign in that year's federal election.

He died at the South Muskoka Memorial Hospital in Bracebridge, Ontario on 25 November 2014.

References

External links
 

1933 births
2014 deaths
McMaster University alumni
Members of the House of Commons of Canada from Ontario
Politicians from Toronto
Progressive Conservative Party of Canada MPs
University of Ottawa alumni